The Worship Sessions is an album by Contemporary Christian music band MercyMe. It was released on August 30, 2011 exclusively through Family Christian Stores. The album consists of covers of popular worship songs and hymns, as well as two original songs by the band itself.

Track listing

References

MercyMe albums
2011 albums
Fair Trade Services albums
Columbia Records albums